Awallani (Aymara awalla the first one of two newborn girl, -ni a suffix to indicate ownership, "the one with the first one of two newborn girl", Hispanicized spelling Aguallane) is a mountain in the Andes of Peru, about  high. It is located in the Puno Region, Lampa Province, on the border of the districts Paratía and Santa Lucía. Awallani lies between the mountains Phisqa Tira in the northeast and Pukasalla in the southwest.

References

Mountains of Puno Region
Mountains of Peru